The 1987 Basildon District Council election took place on 7 May 1987 to elect members of Basildon District Council in Essex, England. This was on the same day as other local elections. One third of the council was up for election; the seats which were last contested in 1983. The Labour Party lost control of the council, which it had held since 1982; the council fell under no overall control.

Overall results

|-
| colspan=2 style="text-align: right; margin-right: 1em" | Total
| style="text-align: right;" | 14
| colspan=5 |
| style="text-align: right;" | 55,392
| style="text-align: right;" |

All comparisons in vote share are to the corresponding 1983 election.

Ward results

Billericay East

Billericay West

Burstead

Fryerns Central

Fryerns East

Laindon

Langdon Hills

Lee Chapel North

Nethermayne

Pitsea East

Pitsea West

Vange

Wickford North

Wickford South

References

1987
1987 English local elections
1980s in Essex